MV Ocean Majesty is a cruise ship, originally built in 1966 as the ferry Juan March.
The ship is now registered in the International Shipping Register of Madeira (MAR), Portugal.

History 
Ocean Majesty was launched as Juan March for the Madrid based ferry operator Trasmediterránea. She was the first of two near identical Albatros-class sisters, the other being the Las Palmas de Gran Canaria. During her service with her original owners Juan March was mainly used to ferry passengers from Spain to the Balearic Islands. In 1985 Juan March was sold to the Sol Mediterranean and became Sol Christina. She was not operated long by these owners, and was sold to become the Kyros Star of Opale Lines. She was then sold to Majestic International Cruises, who rebuilt her from her original ferry-like form into a cruise ship, and she received her current name Ocean Majesty. Majestic International operated her for several years, until they chartered Ocean Majesty to Epirotiki in 1994, the latter company renamed her Homeric. Homeric operated for a year until her charter expired, and she was subsequently returned to Majestic International and named Ocean Majesty once again. Majestic International has chartered her to many different companies since 1995, most frequently to the British vacation company Page & Moy. Since 2013 she has been operated by German cruise company Hansa Touristik between May and October. During 2021 was laid up at Chalkis Shipyard, Greece before returning to service.

Winter periods 2017 to 2019, MV Ocean Majesty was cruising to Canary islands with Polish charterers ITAKA.

After a 2 years laid-up because of COVID-19 pandemic, Mv Ocean Majesty sailed again for a very successful 2022 season with Hansa. For 2023 MV Ocean Majesty will sail again with Hansa from May to October.

The future 
Ocean Majesty fulfils SOLAS 2010 in her current construction.

References

1965 ships
Cruise ships of Portugal
Passenger ships of Spain
Cruise ships of the United Kingdom